Sadr or SADR may refer to:

Places
Sadr City, a neighborhood in Baghdad, Iraq
Sadr, Iran, a village in East Azerbaijan Province, Iran
Sahrawi Arab Democratic Republic (SADR), a self-proclaimed state in parts of the Western Sahara

Other uses
Sadr (name), a family name originating in Lebanon
Sadr (surname), list of people with the surname
Sadr (title), a title primarily used in the Iranian world to designate an exceptional person, such as a scholar
Source-address dependent routing or source-specific routing
Gamma Cygni or Sadr, a star 
The Urdu word for president, used to refer to the President of Pakistan

See also
Sadar (disambiguation)
Sadri (disambiguation)
Sadan (disambiguation)